Best Way is a Ukrainian company which develops real-time strategy video games. The company was founded in 1991 in Sievierodonetsk, Luhans'k, Ukraine. Its first title was Soldiers: Heroes of WWII. The Best Way's games use the Gem game engine.

Projects

Own games
Soldiers: Heroes of WWII (June 2004), publishers: 1C Company, Codemasters
Faces of War (September 2006), publishers: 1C Company, Ubisoft
Men of War (February 2009), publishers: 1C Company, 505 Games
Men of War II: Arena formally known as "Soldiers: Arena" (Discontinued on the August 10, 2021 in favor of Men of War II), publishers: 1C Online Games
Men of War II (2023), publishers: Fulqrum Publishing

Games that use the Gem game engine 
RTS games
 Outfront: Saboteurs
 Outfront: Saboteurs 2
 Outfront: Saboteurs 3
 Men of War: Red Tide
 Men of War: Assault Squad
 Men of War: Vietnam
 Men of War: Condemned Heroes
 Men of War: Assault Squad 2
 Battle of Empires: 1914-1918
 Call to Arms
 Assault Squad 2: Men of War Origins
 Men of War: Assault Squad 2 - Cold War
Majesty 2
 Majesty 2: The Fantasy Kingdom Sim
 Majesty 2: Kingmaker
 Majesty 2: Battles of Ardania
 Majesty 2: Monster Kingdom

Cancelled games 
Nuclear Union (Cancelled, 2014), publisher: 1C Company
 Tskhinvali Is On Fire (Cancelled), developer: Aarre Games Ltd, publisher: Aarre Games Ltd
Men of War II: Arena (Cancelled, September 2021), publishers: 1C Company

References

External links
 Best Way website

Video game companies established in 1991
Video game companies of Ukraine
Video game development companies
1991 establishments in Ukraine